The Bangladesh Technical Education Board is a state regulatory board responsible for monitoring and developing technical and vocational education in the secondary level (SSC), 2-year higher secondary level (HSC/Vocational), 4-year Diploma in Engineering degree and 4-year Diploma in Medical Technology degree throughout the People's Republic of Bangladesh. The board sets the curriculum, develops learning materials, grants affiliation to technical and vocational institutions, governs admissions, conducts examination, and awards diploma certifications.

Institutions

These institutions are affiliated with this board.

Private medical technology institute 
 Dhaka Diploma Medical Institute (DDMI), Dhaka
 Saic Medical Technology Institute, Dhaka
 Dhaka Medical Institute

Public engineering institutes 

 Faridpur Polytechnic Institute
 Dhaka Polytechnic Institute
 Borishal Polytechnic Institute
 Jashore Polytechnic Institute
 Bogra Polytechnic Institute
 Dhaka Mohila Polytechnic Institute
 Rajshahi Polytechnic Institute
 Rajshahi Mohila Polytechnic Institute
 Mymensingh Polytechnic Institute
 Sylhet Polytechnic Institute
 Jhenaidah Polytechnic Institute
 Kushtia Polytechnic Institute
 Rangpur Polytechnic Institute
 Feni Polytechnic Institute
 Bangladesh Sweden Polytechnic Institute
 Barguna Polytechnic Institute
 Bhola Polytechnic Institute
 Brahmanbaria Polytechnic Institute
 Chandpur Polytechnic Institute
 Chapainawabgonj Polytechnic Institute
 Chattogram Polytechnic Institute
 Cumilla Polytechnic Institute
 Cox's Bazar Polytechnic Institute
 Dinajpur Polytechnic Institute
 Feni Computer Institute
 Gopalgonj Polytechnic Institute
 Graphic Arts Institute (Dhaka)
 Habiganj Polytechnic Institute
 Khulna Polytechnic Institute
 Kishoregonj Polytechnic Institute
 Lokkhipur Polytechnic Institute
 Magura Polytechnic Institute
 Moulobhibazar Polytechnic Institute
 Munshigonj Polytechnic Institute
 Narayangonj Polytechnic Institute
 Norshingdi Polytechnic Institute
 Pabna Polytechnic Institute
 Potuakhali Polytechnic Institute
 Satkhira Polytechnic Institute
 Shoriotpur Polytechnic Institute
 Sherpur Polytechnic Institute
 Sirajgonj Polytechnic Institute
 Tangail Polytechnic Institute
 Thakurgaon Polytechnic Institute
 Kurigram Polytechnic Institute
 Bangladesh Institute of Glass and Ceramics
 Bangladesh Survey Institute
 Nazipur Institute of Engineering and Technology

Private engineering institutes 
Barisal Ideal Polytechnic Institute
 National Institute of Engineering and Technology (Dhaka)
 Shyamoli Ideal Polytechnic Institute
 National Institute of Engineering and Technology (Narayangonj)
 Daffodil Polytechnic Institute
 Institute of communication Technology (ICT), House 16 Alaol Ave, Uttara- House Building, Dhaka 1230,
 BGIFT Institute of Science and Technology
 Western Ideal Institute
 Mangrove Institute of Science and Technology
Bangladesh Institute of Information Technology
Western Ideal Institute (Narayangonj)
National Professional Institute (Dhaka)
National Institute of Technology, Chattogram
MAWST Institute of Technology
 Ahsanullah Institute of Technical and Vocational Education
 Mirpur Polytechnic Institute
 National Institute of Engineering and Technology
 Bangladesh Polytechnic Institute
 City Textile Engineering Institute
 Institute Of Computer Science Technology (ICST), Feni
 Compact Polytechnic Institute, Feni
 Bangladesh Institute of Technology
 National Polytechnic Institute (Dhaka)
 National Polytechnic College (Chattogram)
 Bangladesh Textile Engineering College
 Progressive Polytechnic Institute
 Sufi Faruq Institute of Engineering and Technology
 Rumdo Institute of Modern Technology
Dimla Computer Science and Polytechnic College
Dimla Textile Institute
Netrokona Institute of Science and Technology
Quamrul Islam Siddique Institute
Gurukul Private Engineering Institute
Kushtia City Polytechnic & Engineering Institute
BCI Engineering Institute
Uttara Polytechnic Institute, Dhaka
Institute of Science and Information Technology, Dhaka
Daffodil Technical Institute, Dhaka
Dhamrai Polytechnic Institute, Dhaka

Public agriculture institutes 

 Agriculture Training Institute, Rahmatpur, Barisal
 Agriculture Training Institute, Bancharampur, Brahmanbaria
 Agriculture Training Institute, Hathazari, Chittagong

Private agriculture institutes 
 Majeda Begum Krishi Projukti College
 Bahar Krishi College

Public fisheries institutes 

 Fisheries Diploma Institute, Chandpur
 Fisheries Diploma Institute, Gopalganj
 Fisheries Diploma Institute, Kishoreganj
 Fisheries Diploma Institute, Sirajganj

Private fisheries institutes 

 Bagerha Krishi Projukti Institute
 Uttara Agriculture Institute
 Betgari Mir Shah Alam Krishi and Motsho Projukti Institute
 M. S. Zoha Krishi College
 Surid Technical Science & Commerce College

Public forestry institute 

 Forestry Science and Technology Institute, Chattagram

Public livestock institute 
 Institute of Livestock Science and Technology (ILST), Gaibandha

Public marine & shipbuilding technology institutes 

 Institute of Marine Technology, Bagerhat
 Institute of Marine Technology, Chadpur
 Institute of Marine Technology, Faridpur
 Institute of Marine Technology, Munshiganj
 Bangladesh Institute of Marine Technology, Narayanganj
 Institute of Marine Technology, Sirajganj

Private textile and GDPM technology institutes 

 Khan Jahan Ali Polytechnic Institute
 Infra Polytechnic Institute
 Model Polytechnic Institute

HSC-vocational institutes 

 Bagerhat Technical School and College
 Bandarban Technical School and College
 Govt. Technical School and College, Gazipur

HSC-BM (business management) institutes 

 Barisal Technical School and College
 Bhola Technical School and College
 Durgasrom Mohila Bm College Netrakona
 Bangladesh Institute of Studies (BIS)
National Youth and Technical training Center

Basic trade course institutes 

 A K Khan UCEP Kalurghat Technical School, Chittagong
 RISDA Institute of Technology (RIT), Birulia, Savar
 RISDA Institute of Technology (RIT), Saltha, Faridpur

Registered CBT&A institute under NTVQF 

 Sheikh Fazilatunecha Mujib Mohila Technical Training Center

References

External links
 

Educational organisations based in Bangladesh
Career and technical education in Bangladesh
Vocational education in Bangladesh
Education Board in Bangladesh
Organisations based in Chittagong
Polytechnic institutes in Bangladesh